The Fix is the seventh studio album by American rapper Scarface. The album was released on August 6, 2002. The album debuted at #4 on the Billboard 200 chart, with well over 160,000 copies sold in its 1st week. Guest artists on the album include Jay-Z, Beanie Sigel, Nas, Faith Evans, and WC. Producers include Mike Dean, Kanye West, Tony Pizarro, Nottz, and The Neptunes.

The Fix was Scarface's first release on Def Jam Recordings; he became the president of Def Jam South in 2001. Three singles were released from The Fix. The first was the song "Guess Who's Back" featuring Jay-Z and Beanie Sigel. The second was "My Block", with a music video directed by Marc Klasfeld. The third single "Someday" contained a music video that was directed by former 10cc member Kevin Godley. The track "In Cold Blood" was featured on the video game Def Jam Vendetta, where Scarface is also included as a playable fighter.

In 2010, it was reported by HipHopDX Scarface would be making a sequel to The Fix called The Habit.

Reception

In 2009, Pitchfork ranked the album at #185 on their Top 200 Albums of the 2000s list.

Track listing

Chart positions

Weekly charts

Year-end charts

References

2002 albums
Scarface (rapper) albums
Def Jam Recordings albums
Albums produced by the Neptunes
Albums produced by Kanye West
Albums produced by Nottz
Albums produced by Mike Dean (record producer)